Stuart Christie (10 July 1946 – 15 August 2020) was a Scottish anarchist writer and publisher. When aged 18, Christie was arrested  while carrying explosives to assassinate the Spanish caudillo, General  Francisco Franco. He was later alleged to be a member of the Angry Brigade, but was acquitted of related charges. He went on to found the Cienfuegos Press publishing house, as well as radical publications The Free-Winged Eagle and The Hastings Trawler, and in 2006 the online Anarchist Film Channel, which hosts films and documentaries with anarchist and libertarian socialist themes. His memoir Granny Made Me an Anarchist was published in 2004.

Biography

Early life
Christie was born in the Partick area of Glasgow and raised in Blantyre by his mother and grandparents, becoming an anarchist at a young age. He ascribed this to his grandmother's influence, "Basically, what she did was provide a moral barometer which married almost exactly with that of libertarian socialism and anarchism, and she provided the star which I followed." He joined the Anarchist Federation in Glasgow in 1962, at the age of 16. He became active in the Campaign for Nuclear Disarmament, attracted to the more militant approach of the Direct Action Committee and Committee of 100, and took part in the confrontational Faslane Naval Base CND demonstration on 14 February 1963, among others.

Attempt to assassinate Franco
On the last day of July 1964, an 18-year-old Christie departed London for Paris, where he picked up plastic explosives from the anarchist organisation Defensa Interior.

Before he left England, he was interviewed for a television programme with Malcolm Muggeridge, a known MI6 contact, and asked whether he felt the assassination of Franco would be right.  He answered that it would; when the programme was broadcast after his arrest in Spain, these comments were edited out.

Christie hitchhiked into Spain and was arrested in Madrid on 11 August 1964 in possession of explosives.  He faced a military trial and a possible execution sentence by garrote, but was instead sentenced to twenty years in prison.  An accomplice, Fernando Carballo Blanco, was sentenced to thirty years' imprisonment.  He served three years in Carabanchel Prison, where he studied for A-Levels and was brought into contact with anarchist prisoners, including Miguel García García, Luis Andres Edo and Juan Busquets. Christie was later freed. The official reason given by Francoist Spain was that it was due to a plea from Christie's mother.

Back in Britain

After his release he continued his activism in the British anarchist movement, re-formed the Anarchist Black Cross and Black Flag with Albert Meltzer, was acquitted of involvement with the Angry Brigade, and started the publishing house Cienfuegos Press, which for a number of years he operated from Sanday, Orkney, where he also edited and published a local Orcadian newspaper, The Free-Winged Eagle.

Christie had various writing and journalistic jobs including as editor of an unauthorised British edition of Pravda and Argumenty i Fakty (Arguments and Facts International) in the late years of the Soviet Union and the early years of the Russian Federation.

Published work
An updated and single-volume version of his autobiography Granny Made Me an Anarchist was published in 2004 by Scribner. It had previously been published in three parts, the other titles being General Franco Made Me a Terrorist, and Edward Heath Made Me Angry. Christie attracted criticism from some fellow anarchists for making a gestural protest vote against Labour and its war in Iraq by voting for George Galloway's Respect - The Unity Coalition in the European Parliament elections that year, because of the general anarchist stance against participating in capitalist democracy. Christie also wrote articles attacking freemasonry.

He also wrote, with Meltzer, The Floodgates of Anarchy. His other books include Stefano Delle Chiaie: Portrait of a Black Terrorist, (on Italian neo-fascist terrorist Stefano Delle Chiaie, founder of Avanguardia Nazionale and member of P2 masonic lodge) and We, the Anarchists! A study of the Iberian Anarchist Federation (FAI) 1927–1937 (2000).
As a publisher Christie founded Cienfuegos Press in 1972 and edited the Cienfuegos Anarchist Review (c. 1977–1982), Refract Publications (1982), The Meltzer Press (1996) and Christiebooks/Christiebooks.com/Read 'N' Noir. His The Christie File was published by the Cienfuegos Press in 1980. He also edited The Hastings Trawler, a monthly magazine that ran from 2005 to 2006.

Christie also translated into English the biography of Francisco Sabate Llopart, Sabate: An Extraordinary Guerrilla, by Antonio Téllez Solá.

Reviews
Ross, Raymond J. (1981), "Review of The Christie File", in Murray, Glen (ed.), Cencrastus No. 6, Autumn 1982, p. 35

Personal life
Christie's wife of more than 50 years, Brenda Christie, died of cancer at the age of 70 in June 2019. Stuart Christie died aged 74, also from cancer, on 15 August 2020.

See also 
Colin Ward

References

Further reading
 
1964: Stuart Christie's account of his actions in a Franco assassination attempt

External links
ChristieBooks and Anarchist Film Channel, Radio etc.
"'My stomach churned. Something had gone badly wrong … '", an edited extract from Granny Made Me an Anarchist, by Stuart Christie. Guardian.co.uk Guardian News and Media Limited. 23 August 2004.
Interviews
" Looking Back at Anger", Stuart Christie interview with Andrew Stevens. 3:AM Magazine. 2004.
 BBC Witness History: The Plot to Kill Franco

1946 births
2020 deaths
People from Partick
Historians of anarchism
Anarchist writers
Scottish anarchists
Scottish Anti-Francoists
Scottish autobiographers
Scottish publishers (people)
Scottish translators
Scottish people imprisoned abroad
Far-left politics in Scotland
Anarchism in Scotland
Catalan–English translators